The Thirteenth Legislative Assembly of Nagaland was constituted after the 2018 Nagaland Legislative Assembly election which was held on 27 February 2018 in 59 out of 60 constituencies for the Legislative Assembly of Nagaland. The scheduled election in Northern Angami II constituency did not take place as the incumbent MLA Neiphiu Rio was declared elected unopposed.

Notable Members

Members of Legislative Assembly 
The following are the Members of the Nagaland Legislative Assembly:

See also 

 Nagaland Legislative Assembly
 2018 Nagaland Legislative Assembly Election
 Northeast India
 List of constituencies of the Nagaland Legislative Assembly

References 

Politics of Nagaland